Ion Gheorghe may refer to:

 Ion Gheorghe (footballer) (born 1999), Romanian footballer
  (1893–1957), Romanian general
  (1935–2021), Romanian poet
 Ion Gheorghe Duca (1879–1933), Romanian politician and prime minister
 Ion Gheorghe Ionescu (born 1938), Romanian footballer
 Ion Gheorghe Iosif Maurer (1902–2000), Romanian communist politician and lawyer

See also
  (1923–2009), Romanian general